Edith Hollant (born 1938) is a Haitian photographer and painter. Hailing from Port-au-Prince, Hollant first exhibited her works in 1955. She has since exhibited in New York City.

References
 
 

1938 births
Haitian painters
Haitian photographers
Haitian women photographers
Living people
Haitian women painters
21st-century women artists